The 1969–70 Ice hockey Bundesliga season was the 12th season of the Ice hockey Bundesliga, the top level of ice hockey in Germany. 12 teams participated in the league, and EV Landshut won the championship.

First round

Relegation round

Final round

References

External links
Season on hockeyarchives.info

Eishockey-Bundesliga seasons
German
Bund